Poropuntius carinatus is a species of ray-finned fish in the genus Poropuntius from the upper Mekong drainage in Yunnan, Laos, Thailand and probably Myanmar.

References 

carinatus
Taxa named by Wu Hsien-Wen
Taxa named by Lin Ren-Duan
Fish described in 1977